Zabrus balcanicus is a species of ground beetle in the Pelor subgenus that can be found in Bulgaria, Kosovo, Montenegro, North Macedonia, Serbia, Voivodina and Turkey.

External links
Zabrus balcanicus

Beetles described in 1883
Beetles of Europe
Zabrus